The Katabatic Wind (released 2011 in Oslo, Norway by the label Bolage – BLGCD013) is the debut solo piano album by the mini Brass Band Magic Pocket.

Reception 

The review by Terje Mosnes of the Norwegian newspaper Dagbladet awarded the album 5 stars (dice), and the reviewer Tor Hammerø of the electronic Norwegian newspaper NettAvisen awarded the album 4 stars (dice)

With Morten Qvenild himself on the team as special guest, the ambitions are high. The quartet was recognized in Norway already in 2004, when they won the Jazzintro award, and the musicians shows extreme instrumentalist and composer skills.

Track listing 
All compositions as indicated
«Call Me Ishmael» (5:28) – Magic Pocket & Qvenild
«The Thar Desert » (7:02) – Nylander
«A Scar» (3:45) – Johannessen
«Darts» (1:44) - Powell
«The Wall» (5:04) - Powell
«Used To Be Doublespeak» (5:47) - Powell
«The Katabatic Wind» (2:51) – Johannessen & Nylander
«Ahab's Pipe» (6:48) – Magic Pocket & Qvenild
«It's All Gone» (3:01) – Johannessen
«Dropmaker» (4:31) – Herskedal
Recorded at Athletic Sound, Halden on April 24-25th 2010

Personnel 
Hayden Powell - trumpet
Erik Johannessen - trombone
Daniel Herskedal - tuba
Erik Nylander - drums

Credits 
Executive producers – Håvard Stubø & Tord Rønning Krogtoft
Mastered by – Bob Katz
Mixed by – Kai Andersen & Magic Pocket
Producer – Magic Pocket
Recorded yy – Kai Andersen

Notes 
Recorded at Athletic Sound, Halden on April 24-25th 2010
Supported by Norwegian Academy of Music and the Norwegian «Fond For Utøvende Kunstnere»

References

External links 
The Katabatic Wind on Myspace

Magic Pocket albums
2012 debut albums